Will Gardner is a character of CBS television series The Good Wife and was portrayed by Josh Charles for the first five seasons of the show's run. For his performance, Charles received two Primetime Emmy Award nominations as well as a Golden Globe nomination.

Background
An old friend of Alicia's, in the pilot he helped her get a job with the firm and is constantly trying to avoid appearing as if he favors her. This is complicated by the fact that the two have feelings for each other. Will and Alicia have an affair beginning at the end of season two. In season three they break up when Alicia's daughter goes missing, and Alicia decides she needs to focus more on her children. He is seen as very much of a ladies' man throughout the series and had various love affairs and girlfriends. Will generally had a good working relationship with Diane Lockhart, his co-managing partner at the firm, and the two demonstrate a shrewd ability to guide their business, even through difficult times. Will plays in a regular pick-up basketball game with other attorneys and judges, and has friendships with the players that are eventually scrutinized. During season three, Will is suspended from practicing law for six months as punishment stemming from an old bribery scandal but returns to the firm in season four. In season five after much planning, Alicia and Cary leave Lockhart & Gardner to start their own firm; Will takes this betrayal personally. In episode 15 of the fifth season, he is shot and killed in the courtroom by his client Jeffrey Grant (played by Hunter Parrish).

Following his death, he appeared in dream sequences in episodes "Minds Eye" and the series finale, "End".

References

American male characters in television
Fictional American lawyers
Fictional characters from Chicago
The Good Wife characters
Television characters introduced in 2009
Fictional murdered people